The Wiss Platte (also known as Weissplatte or Weißplatte) is a mountain in the Rätikon range of the Alps, located on the border between Austria and Switzerland. It lies between Schruns (Vorarlberg) and St. Antönien (Graubünden).

References

External links

 Wiss Platte on Hikr

Mountains of the Alps
Mountains of Graubünden
Mountains of Vorarlberg
Austria–Switzerland border
International mountains of Europe
Mountains of Switzerland
Two-thousanders of Switzerland